Zoltán Kovács may refer to:

Politicians
Zoltán Kovács (politician, born 1957), Hungarian politician, MP, former Mayor of Pápa
Zoltán Kovács (politician, born 1969), Hungarian politician, Secretary of State for Public Diplomacy and Relations

Sportspeople
Zoltán Kovács (canoeist), Hungarian canoer
Zoltan Kovács (chess player) (born 1930), Austrian and Hungarian chess master
Zoltan Kovács (footballer, born 1954), Croatian-born Hungarian football coach
Zoltán Kovács (footballer, born 1973), retired Hungarian footballer
Zoltán Kovács (footballer, born 1984), Hungarian footballer for Újpest FC
Zoltán Kovács (footballer, born 1986) (1986–2013), Hungarian football player for REAC
Zoltán Kovács (ice hockey) (born 1962), Hungarian ice hockey coach, and recipient of Paul Loicq Award
Zoltán Kovács (sport shooter) (born 1964), Hungarian Olympic sport shooter
Zoltán Kovács (weightlifter) (born 1977), Hungarian weightlifter
Zoltán Kovács (water polo) (born 1974), Hungarian water polo player

Others
Zoltán Kovács, writer in Nocturnal Submissions
Zoltán Kovács, developer in GeoGebra